Axel Laurance (born 13 April 2001) is a French cyclist, who currently rides for UCI Continental team . He finished second at the 2022 Bretagne Classic Ouest–France in his first year as a professional. He will move to UCI WorldTeam  for the 2024 season.

Major results
2018
 1st Stage 2a (TTT) Aubel–Thimister–Stavelot
 6th Overall Sint-Martinusprijs Kontich
2019
 1st Stage 1 Grand Prix Rüebliland
 5th Overall Ronde des Vallées
1st Stage 1
 7th Overall Aubel–Thimister–Stavelot
1st Stage 2a (TTT)
2021
 8th Overall Course de la Paix U23
1st Stage 3
2022
 2nd Bretagne Classic
 5th Overall CRO Race
1st Stage 4
 10th Overall Tour de Bretagne

References

External links

2001 births
Living people
French male cyclists
Cyclo-cross cyclists
21st-century French people